Exton is a village and civil parish  north-east of Dulverton and  south-west of Dunster in Somerset, England. It lies on the River Exe on Exmoor. The parish includes the village of Bridgetown and covers 2,017 ha, all of which is within the national park.

History

The parish of Exton was part of the Williton and Freemanners Hundred.

Edbrooke Bridge over the River Exe is medieval in origin.

In the Middle Ages the manor passed with the forestership of the Royal Forest of Exmoor, later being owned by the Rollers and then the Siderfins of Croydon who sold it in 1700, following a private Act of parliament in 1698.

Governance

The parish council has responsibility for local issues, including setting an annual precept (local rate) to cover the council's operating costs and producing annual accounts for public scrutiny. The parish council evaluates local planning applications and works with the local police, district council officers, and neighbourhood watch groups on matters of crime, security, and traffic. The parish council's role also includes initiating projects for the maintenance and repair of parish facilities, as well as consulting with the district council on the maintenance, repair, and improvement of highways, drainage, footpaths, public transport, and street cleaning. Conservation matters (including trees and listed buildings) and environmental issues are also the responsibility of the council.

The village falls within the non-metropolitan district of Somerset West and Taunton, which was established on 1 April 2019. It was previously in the district of West Somerset, which was formed on 1 April 1974 under the Local Government Act 1972, and part of Dulverton Rural District before that. The district council is responsible for local planning and building control, local roads, council housing, environmental health, markets and fairs, refuse collection and recycling, cemeteries and crematoria, leisure services, parks, and tourism.

Somerset County Council is responsible for running the largest and most expensive local services such as education, social services, libraries, main roads, public transport, policing and fire services, trading standards, waste disposal and strategic planning.

As Exton falls within the Exmoor National Park some functions normally administered by district or county councils have, since 1997, fallen under the Exmoor National Park Authority, which is known as a 'single purpose' authority, which aims to "conserve and enhance the natural beauty, wildlife and cultural heritage of the National Parks" and "promote opportunities for the understanding and enjoyment of the special qualities of the Parks by the public", including responsibility for the conservation of the historic environment.

It is also part of the Bridgwater and West Somerset county constituency represented in the House of Commons of the Parliament of the United Kingdom. It elects one Member of Parliament (MP) by the first past the post system of election, and was part of the South West England constituency of the European Parliament prior to Britain leaving the European Union in January 2020, which elected six MEPs using the d'Hondt method of party-list proportional representation.

Religious sites

The Norman Church of St Peter has a 13th-century tower and has been designated by English Heritage as a Grade II* listed building.

References

External links

Villages in West Somerset
Exmoor
Civil parishes in Somerset